Van Hung may refer to:

MV Van Hung, a Vietnamese cargo ship
Peter Nguyen Van Hung (born 1958), Vietnamese Australian Catholic priest and human rights activist
Nguyễn Văn Hùng (martial artist) (born 1980), Vietnamese martial artist
Nguyễn Văn Hùng (athlete) (born 1989), Vietnamese triple jumper